The Americas Zone was one of the three zones of the regional Davis Cup competition in 1994.

In the Americas Zone, there were three different tiers, called groups, in which teams compete against each other to advance to the upper tier. Winners in Group II advanced to the Americas Zone Group I. Teams who lost their respective ties competed in the relegation play-offs, with winning teams remaining in Group II, whereas teams who lost their play-offs were relegated to the Americas Zone Group III in 1995.

Participating nations

Draw

 and  relegated to Group III in 1995.
 promoted to Group I in 1995.

First round

Canada vs. Jamaica

Guatemala vs. Colombia

Paraguay vs. Venezuela

Puerto Rico vs. Ecuador

Second round

Colombia vs. Canada

Venezuela vs. Ecuador

Relegation play-offs

Guatemala vs. Jamaica

Paraguay vs. Puerto Rico

Third round

Canada vs. Venezuela

References

External links
Davis Cup official website

Davis Cup Americas Zone
Americas Zone Group II